Moon Wiring Club is the recording alias of Ian Hodgson, who releases his music on his own label Blank Workshop.

See also
 Ghost Box Records#Singles & EPs
 Hauntology (music)

References

English electronic music groups